The Tavern may refer to:
 The Tavern (Eufaula, Alabama), listed on the NRHP in Alabama
 The Tavern (Little Rock, Arkansas), listed on the NRHP in Arkansas

See also
Tavern